The 1903 Tempe Normal Owls football team was an American football team that represented Tempe Normal School (later renamed Arizona State University) as an independent during the 1903 college football season. In their fifth season under head coach Frederick M. Irish, the Owls compiled a 2–0 record, shut out both opponents, and outscored their opponents by a combined total of 33 to 0. The team won games against the Phoenix High School (18–0) and the Phoenix Indians (15–0).

Schedule

References

Tempe Normal
Arizona State Sun Devils football seasons
College football undefeated seasons
Tempe Normal Owls football